Alessandro Cortini (born 24 May 1976) is an Italian musician best known for being the keyboard, guitar, and bass player in the industrial band Nine Inch Nails. Cortini is also the frontman for the Los Angeles-based electronic-alternative band SONOIO.

He was a touring member of The Mayfield Four from 2000 to 2002. He was also a founding member of Modwheelmood, an electronic/alternative band from Los Angeles, with former Abandoned Pools guitarist Pelle Hillström. He completed a small Canadian tour with his solo project, blindoldfreak.

Background
Cortini was born in Bologna, and raised in Forlì. Cortini moved from Italy to the United States to study guitar at the Musicians Institute.  After graduating, and straying away from the guitar, he decided to focus on keyboards and synths. From 2001 to 2002, Cortini acted as touring guitarist for The Mayfield Four in support of their album Second Skin. While briefly teaching at the Musicians Institute, he saw an ad for open auditions for Nine Inch Nails.  Reznor stated that Alessandro Cortini "fit in immediately." Reznor also stated that:

Cortini toured with Nine Inch Nails from 2005 to 2008, during the band's "Live: With Teeth", "Performance 2007" and "Lights In The Sky Over North/South America" tours. His primary role was that of touring keyboard player, although he also played guitar and bass guitar on some songs. Besides touring with the band, Cortini also contributed to the instrumental album Ghosts I-IV (receiving co-writing credits on a number of tracks) and the 2008 album The Slip. A Modwheelmood remix of "The Great Destroyer" was also released on the Year Zero remix album Year Zero Remixed, and Cortini features in the live DVD Beside You In Time, as well as the music videos for The Hand That Feeds and Survivalism. He left the band at the end of 2008, citing a desire to pursue other projects.

Cortini was also the frontman of Los Angeles band Modwheelmood, which he led with former Abandoned Pools guitarist Pelle Hillstrom. Together they have released two EPs, ? (2003) and Enemies & Immigrants (2006). In 2007, they released Things Will Change, the companion remix disc for Enemies & Immigrants, and they released the first part of their new album Pearls to Pigs, Vol. 1 on 25 December 2007 exclusively as a digital release.

In fall 2006, Cortini contributed to the Musicians Institute's Recording Artist Program by acting as advisor for one-on-one training with students. In 2009, he filled in for Morgan Nicholls (touring member of Muse) while Nicholls took a leave of absence to be with his newborn son.

Alessandro Cortini worked with Ladytron in the production of two of their albums, Velocifero (2008) and Gravity the Seducer (2011). He also co-produced the second track, "We Are the Sea", from the debut album Crystal World (2013) of Ladytron's main singer, Marnie.

In 2010, he contributed electronic production to a song called "Birds of Prey" by pop artist Christina Aguilera, produced by Ladytron. The song is featured on the deluxe edition of her fourth studio album Bionic.

In summer 2010, Cortini formed the project SONOIO. The band name SONOIO comes from the Italian phrase "sono io", which means "it's me", as it is a solo project consisting solely of Alessandro Cortini. In July 2010 SONOIO released the album SONOIO Blue which was followed up by a remix album in December 2010 NON SONOIO. In June 2011 SONOIO released the album SONOIO Red.

Cortini joined How To Destroy Angels, a project consisting of Trent Reznor, Atticus Ross, Rob Sheridan and Mariqueen Maandig, as a touring member. He performs multiple instruments onstage and in addition remixed under his SONOIO moniker their single "The Spaces In-Between", which was used as the show finale for the majority of the tour. In 2013, Cortini returned to Nine Inch Nails as their touring member, and co-wrote the opening track of Hesitation Marks with Trent Reznor.

In March 2017, Nine Inch Nails' official Twitter account announced Cortini would be part of the 2017 summer performance lineup.

Discography
As himself
2013: Forse 1 (LP, released July 2013)
2013: Forse 2 (LP, released November 2013)
2014: Sonno (LP)
2015: Forse 3 (LP)
2015: Risveglio (LP, released July 2015)
2016: SPIE (EP, released 22 September 2016)
2017: Avanti (LP, released 6 October 2017)
2019: VOLUME MASSIMO (LP, released 27 September 2019)
2021: SCURO CHIARO (LP, released 11 June 2021)

SONOIO
2010: SONOIO (Blue, Album, September 2010)
2011: SONOIO (Red, Album, June 2011)
2018: Fine (Album, July 2018)

Blindoldfreak
2009: 1 (EP, 2009)

Modwheelmood
2003: ? (EP, 2003)
2006: Enemies & Immigrants (EP, released May 2006)
2007: Things Will Change (The companion remix disc to Enemies & Immigrants, released digitally in October 2007.)
2007: Pearls to Pigs, Vol. 1 (EP, released on 25 December 2007)
2008: Pearls to Pigs, Vol. 2 (EP, released on 26 February 2008)
2008: Pearls to Pigs, Vol. 3 (EP, released on 16 July 2008)
2009: Pearls to Pigs (Album, released on 2 June 2009)

With Nine Inch Nails
2007: Beside You in Time (live DVD/HD DVD/Blu-ray, 2007)
2007: Year Zero Remixed - "The Great Destroyer" (remixed by Modwheelmood)
2008: Ghosts I-IV
2008: The Slip
2013: Hesitation Marks

With Jovanotti
2008: Safari

With Ladytron
2008: Velocifero (Collaboration & production. Album, June 2008)
2008: Ghosts single (modwheelmood remix, May 2008)
2011: Gravity the Seducer (Collaboration & Production. Album, September 2011)

With Marnie
2013: "We Are the Sea" (Collaboration & Production. Album track, June 2013)

With Yoav
2008: Adore Adore (modwheelmood remix, 2008)
2008: Beautiful Lie (modwheelmood remix 2008)

With The Mayfield Four
2001: Second Skin

With Puscifer
2007: V is for Vagina (Synthesizer. Album, October 2007)
2011: Conditions of My Parole (Collaboration & Production. Album, October 2011) - "Oceans"

With Lawrence English
2018: Immediate Horizon (Album, November 2018)

With Daniel Avery
2020: Illusion of time (Illusion de la tiempo) (LP, released 27 March 2020)

References

External links
SONOIO Official website
Blindoldfreak Official website
Blindoldfreak Official MySpace
Modwheelmood Official website
Modwheelmood Official MySpace
Who Is Blind Old Freak?

1976 births
Living people
Italian male singers
Italian keyboardists
Industrial musicians
Important Records artists
Italian guitarists
Italian male guitarists
Italian emigrants to the United States
Nine Inch Nails members
People from Forlì
Musicians Institute alumni